Katarina Gabriela Comesaña Plevančić (born 19 June 1992) is an American-born Peruvian footballer who plays as a centre back for the Peru women's national team.

Her father is Peruvian and her mother is Croatian.

International career
Comesaña made her senior debut for Peru in 2018.

References

External links

1992 births
Living people
Citizens of Peru through descent
Peruvian women's footballers
Women's association football central defenders
Women's association football forwards
Peru women's international footballers
Pan American Games competitors for Peru
Footballers at the 2019 Pan American Games
Peruvian people of Croatian descent
American women's soccer players
Soccer players from California
Sportspeople from Sunnyvale, California
American sportspeople of Peruvian descent
American people of Croatian descent
De Anza College alumni
Idaho Vandals women's soccer players
Women's Premier Soccer League players